Parsons is an unincorporated community in Sullivan County, in the U.S. state of Missouri.

History
Early variant names were "Parson" and "Gath". A post office called Gath was established in 1881, the name was changed to Parson in 1881, and the post office closed in 1901. The present name is after Parson Creek.

References

Unincorporated communities in Sullivan County, Missouri
Unincorporated communities in Missouri